This article shows all participating team squads at the 2011 FIVB Volleyball Men's World Cup.

The following is the  roster in the 2011 FIVB Volleyball World League.

The following is the  roster in the 2011 FIVB Volleyball World League.

The following is the  roster in the 2011 FIVB Volleyball World League.

The following is the  roster in the 2011 FIVB Volleyball World League.

The following is the  roster in the 2011 FIVB Volleyball World League.

The following is the  roster in the 2011 FIVB Volleyball World League.

The following is the  roster in the 2011 FIVB Volleyball World League.

The following is the  roster in the 2011 FIVB Volleyball World League.

The following is the  roster in the 2011 FIVB Volleyball World League.

The following is the  roster in the 2011 FIVB Volleyball World League.

The following is the  roster in the 2011 FIVB Volleyball World League.

The following is the  roster in the 2011 FIVB Volleyball World League.

References

F
S